Eois ingrataria is a moth in the  family Geometridae. It is found in India and on Sumbawa.

References

Moths described in 1898
Eois
Moths of Asia